In late September 1811 Napoleon I visited the former Kingdom of Holland; he explained to Armand Augustin Louis de Caulaincourt his goals: a war at sea with England, to form a government, and ordering the "Routes impériales".

Holland as part of the First French Empire
The "Corsican" wanted to control every seaport in the area and on 16 March 1810 Bouches-de-l'Escaut and Bouches-du-Rhin became part of the French Empire. King Louis Bonaparte opposed his older brother when Napoleon's troops were not only occupying the coast but went more inland. (Oudinot had arrived with 20.000 soldiers to prevent smuggling and organize the blockade.) After Napoleon threatened to occupy Amsterdam Louis Bonaparte resigned on 1 July 1810 in favor of Napoleon Louis Bonaparte, his son. The Dutch départments were incorporated in the First French Empire by decree on 9 July; "with Imperial coastguards, customs and police allowed to operate the smuggling staunched at last." On 18 August 1810 Napoleon ordered (by decree) the Dutch army ceased to exist, and incorporated it into the French Imperial army.

On 1 January 1811 the country was divided into seven départements Zuyderzée, Bouches-de-la-Meuse, Yssel-Supérieur, Bouches-de-l'Yssel, Frise (1811), Ems-Occidental, and Ems-Oriental. Also the Batavian navy ceased to exist on that day.

On 18 August 1811 Napoleon ordered (by decree) that everybody without a  last name had to choose one before 1 January 1814.

Until 17 November 1813 Charles-François Lebrun, duc de Plaisance served as governor-general of Holland, reorganizing its départements more efficient and law impartial. He was assisted by the prefects Antoine de Celles, and Goswin de Stassart  with Alexander Gogel on Finance and François Jean-Baptiste d'Alphonse on Internal Affairs as "Intendant-General". The latter was responsible for the "Aperçu sur la Hollande", published in the end of April 1813, full with statistics and details.

Visit

On 24 September 1811 Napoleon arrived in Breskens, on the 27th in Vlissingen, a strategic city he had visited twice before (in 1803 and 1810). A few days later he met with his wife in Antwerp. Then they traveled north to the fortified cities of Willemstad and Hellevoetsluis. He was accompanied with 75 people and by general Dirk van Hogendorp, who would later become governor of Königsberg, Vilnius, Breslau and Hamburg (and mentioned as one of the few in Napoleon's will). On 5 October he arrived in Gorinchem; the next day he left for Utrecht. There he met with members of the Old Catholic Church and Jews. On 9 October he arrived in Amsterdam, the third capital of his empire and stayed a fortnight in the Royal Palace of Amsterdam. With the Dutch merchants he discussed the blockade and the forthcoming collapse of the British economy. He visited several wharfs, the military barracks in Quartier Saint Charles, the fortifications on Pampus, and the Trippenhuis. In the evening François-Joseph Talma gave a performance of Andromaque. Via Broek in Waterland and Medemblik Napoleon traveled to Den Helder, in Napoleon's view the most important naval base in the north. Vice-admiral Jan Willem de Winter, who later would be buried in the Panthéon, joined him to Texel, and discussed the possibilities to keep the English away from the Dutch coast. Because of a lack of funds earlier that year 4.000 Dutch fishermen were forced (through conscript) to join the fleet.

Back in Amsterdam Cornelis Rudolphus Theodorus Krayenhoff accompanied Napoleon to see the fortifications of Muiden and Naarden. On 22 October the universities of Utrecht, Harderwijk, Franeker were closed. Also the Athenaeums of Amsterdam and Deventer were shut. François Noël and George Cuvier proposed to have Leiden and Groningen kept their universities. By decree all christian denominations received money from the municipality.

In Haarlem Napoleon visited the Teylers Museum and Paviljoen Welgelegen. On his way south he visited the locks in Katwijk aan Zee. In Leiden he talked to scientists as Sebald Justinus Brugmans, Gerard Sandifort and Matthijs Siegenbeek. In the Hague he met with Cornelis Felix van Maanen, the president of the Imperial High Court and responsible for introducing the Code Napoléon in the Netherlands. The couple stayed one night in Lange Voorhout Palace; in Rotterdam in Schielandshuis. Through Gouda, Oudewater, and Utrecht Napoleon arrived on Loo Palace. He visited the IJssel, Hattem, where Herman Willem Daendels' wife lived, and Zwolle. On the last day of October he left Nijmegen and travelled to Wesel.

Before Napoleon arrived a Cadastre and Civil registry were introduced.  After he left  the French tax and juridical system became effective on 1 January 1812.  Between 1810-1813 around 35.000 Dutchmen between 20 and 50 were forced to join his Grande Armée or his fleet; around 25.000 joined Napoleon to Russia. Most Dutchmen served in the 123rd, 124th, 125th and 126th Regiment d’Infanterie de Ligne, and 33e Régiment d’Infanterie Légère.

Legacy 
Napoleon brought a new bureaucracy with him, such as the nationwide civil registration of births, marriages and deaths. This benefitted the government (tracking the coming of age of taxable and conscriptable persons), but also the people. The new civil records had more consistent detail and accessibility in central repositories than the scattered religious records people had relied on previously, and the separation of church and state in record keeping is now standard in most countries.

His instruction in 1811 obliging those without a surname to choose one had an unexpected legacy, however. While surnames are also standard today, many objected at the time.  In an act of defiance, they chose names in Dutch which were silly, rude or plain pornographic - knowing the new French bureaucrats could not understand them.  The milder names survive intact to this day, such as "De Hond" (The Dog), "Aardappel" (Potato), "Naaktgeboren" (born naked),  while the ruder names were largely toned down such as "Naakt In 't Veld" (Naked in the Field) - and its variants with interesting activities in said field - which are usually only seen today as "In 't Veld" (In the Field).

References

Notes

Sources
 Gijsberti Hodenpijl, C.F. (1904) Napoleon in Holland.
 Homan, G.D. (1978) Nederland in de Napoleontische Tijd 1795-1815.
 Joor, J. (2000) De Adelaar en het Lam. Onrust, opruiing en onwilligheid in Nederland ten tijde van het Koninkrijk Holland en de Inlijving bij het Franse Keizerrijk (1806–1813), p. 503-510.
 Schama, S. (1987) Patriots and Liberators. Revolution in the Netherlands 1780 - 1830. Chapter 13 "Babylon Undone" 1810-1813.

External links
 Inspectiereis Napoleon 1811
 Napoleon bezoekt Nederland 
 Napoleon in Nederland
 Napoleon in Amsterdam
 Napoleon in de polder
 Napoleon in Nederland

Napoleon
First French Empire
1811 in the Netherlands